John Leader may refer to:
 John Leader (cricketer), New Zealand cricketer and mountaineer
 John Temple Leader, English politician and connoisseur
 John Francis Leader, Irish psychologist and cognitive scientist